is a passenger railway station  located in the town of Iwami, Iwami District, Tottori Prefecture, Japan. It is operated by the West Japan Railway Company (JR West).

Lines
Only local trains stop at this station.

Station layout
The station consists of a single ground-level opposed side platform serving one bi-directional track.  The station is unattended.

Adjacent stations

History
Ōiwa Station opened on January 1, 1950.  With the privatization of the Japan National Railways (JNR) on April 1, 1987, the station came under the aegis of the West Japan Railway Company.

Passenger statistics
In fiscal 2018, the station was used by an average of 204 passengers daily.

Surrounding area
Tottori Prefectural Route 328 Fukube Iwami Line (former National Route 9)
Japan National Route 178
Otani housing complex
Iwami Municipal Iwami Nishi Elementary School

See also
List of railway stations in Japan

References

External links 

 Ōiwa Station from JR-Odekake.net 

Railway stations in Tottori Prefecture
Sanin Main Line
Railway stations in Japan opened in 1950
Iwami, Tottori